Ancylosis dumetella is a species of snout moth in the genus Ancylosis. It was described by Émile Louis Ragonot in 1887, and is known from Algeria, Iran, Turkey, as well as Siberia.

References

Moths described in 1887
dumetella
Moths of Africa
Moths of Asia